Julius Caesar's Crossing the Rubicon river was an event in 49 BC that precipitated the Roman Civil War.

Crossing the Rubicon may also refer to:

 Metaphorically, a point of no return

Music
Albums
 Crossing the Rubicon (Armageddon album), 1997
 Crossing the Rubicon (Revisited), a re-recorded version, 2016
 Crossing the Rubicon (The Sounds album), 2009

Songs
 "Crossing the Rubicon", by The Human Abstract from Nocturne, 2006
 "Crossing the Rubicon", by Mattias Eklundh from Freak Guitar: The Smorgasbord, 2013
 "Crossing the Rubicon", by Revolution Renaissance from Trinity, 2010
 "Crossing the Rubicon", by Enter Shikari from Nothing Is True & Everything Is Possible, 2020
 "Crossing the Rubicon" (song), by Bob Dylan from Rough and Rowdy Ways, 2020

Other uses
 "Crossing the Rubicon" (Beast Wars), a television episode
 "Crossing the Rubicon", a chapter of the manga Bleach
 Crossing the Rubicon: The Decline of the American Empire at the End of the Age of Oil, a 2004 book by Michael Ruppert

See also
 Rubicon speech, a 1985 policy speech on apartheid by South African President P. W. Botha
 Rubicon (disambiguation)
 River Rubicon (disambiguation)

Metaphors referring to places